Big Heart Falls is a waterfall on the outlet stream of Big Heart Lake, which eventually flows into the Skykomish River, in King County, Washington. It is located between the outlet of Big Heart Lake and the inlet of Delta Lake.

The falls have two stages separated by a series of cascades. The waterfall is also very difficult to access. For one to reach it, one must circumnavigate Delta Lake and cross Copper Creek, a large glacial stream.

The waterfall is located less than a quarter mile from Angeline Falls, and shares the same cliff with it. Big Heart Lake was presumably named because of its roughly heart shaped surface.

References

Waterfalls of King County, Washington
Waterfalls of Washington (state)
Tiered waterfalls